Decha Sa-ardchom  (born 13 August 1986), simply known as Aof, is a Thai professional footballer who plays for Muang Loei United in the Thai League 3 as a midfielder.

References

External links
 Profile at Goal
 

1986 births
Living people
Decha Sa-ardchom
Decha Sa-ardchom
Association football midfielders
Decha Sa-ardchom
Decha Sa-ardchom
Decha Sa-ardchom
Decha Sa-ardchom
Decha Sa-ardchom